Guichenotia macrantha, commonly known as large-flowered guichenotia, is a species of flowering plant in the family Malvaceae.  It is a shrub with grey-green leaves, mauve flowers and is endemic to Western Australia.

Description
Flowering occurs from May to September and the fruit is a woody, elliptic-shaped capsule.

Taxonomy and naming
Guichenotia macrantha was first formally described in 1846 by Russian botanist Nikolai Turczaninow and the description was published in Bulletin de la Société Impériale des Naturalistes de Moscou.The specific epithet (macrantha) means "large flowered".

Distribution and habitat
Large-flowered guichenotia grows on a variety of soils including clay sands, sands, gravel and granite from the Murchison River to Merredin.

References

Byttnerioideae
Malvales of Australia
Rosids of Western Australia
Taxa named by Nikolai Turczaninow